Nadezhda Adolfovna Joffe (1906 – March 18, 1999) was a Soviet Trotskyist and daughter of early Soviet leader Adolph Joffe.

Life and career

Joffe joined the Trotskyist Left Opposition within the Soviet Communist Party shortly after it was formed in 1923 and was first exiled from Moscow in 1929. She was re-arrested at the beginning of the Great Purge in 1936, and sent to Kolyma labor camps in Siberia, where her first husband, Trotskyist Pavel Kossakovsky, was killed in 1938. She was the last person to see Leon Trotsky's first wife, Aleksandra Sokolovskaya, alive in Kolyma in 1938.

After Stalin's death in 1953, Joffe's sentence was annulled and she returned to Moscow in 1956. She wrote a book of memoirs, Back in Time: My Life, My Fate, My Epoch in 1971-72, which was first published in Moscow after the dissolution of the Soviet Union in 1992.

Her family emigrated to the United States at the end of her life and she settled in Brooklyn, New York, where she worked on her father's biography and his letters until her death in 1999, aged 92, collaborating with Iskra Research publishing house.

References
 Nadezhda Joffe. Back in Time: My Life, My Fate, My Epoch, Oak Park, MI, Labor Publications, 1995,  (translated from the Russian by Frederick S. Choate) Original Russian title Vremya Nazad.
 Nadezhda Joffe. On Trotsky's Romances, Real and Imagined, a letter published in Novoye Russkoye Slovo, March 18, 1997.
 Chanie Rosenberg. World revolution and happiness for all. Socialist Review, No. 185, April 1995, p. 28.
 Morris Slavin. The Memoirs of Nadezhda Joffe. Against the Current, No.  67, March–April 1997.
 John Plant. Back in Time. Revolutionary History, Vol. 6 No. 4, 1997.
 Helen Halyard. Nadezhda Joffe 1906-1999. Obituary in Workers' Liberty #57, 1999.

1906 births
1999 deaths
Expelled members of the Communist Party of the Soviet Union
American people of Russian-Jewish descent
Russian Jews
Jewish socialists
Russian memoirists
Russian Trotskyists
Russian women writers
Soviet women writers
Soviet writers
Soviet rehabilitations
Soviet Trotskyists
Soviet Jews
Women memoirists
20th-century American women writers
Communist women writers
20th-century memoirists